Leônidas Soares Damasceno (born 17 October 1995), commonly known as Leonidas, is a Brazilian football midfielder who plays for Valadares Gala.

Career
Leonidas is a product of Fluminense FC and Goiás Esporte Clube youth sportive systems. During 2015–2016 he played in the Hong Kong Premier League, but in January 2017 returned to Brazil and signed contract with Villa Nova Atlético Clube.

In May 2017 he signed a 2 year deal with the Ukrainian Premier League's FC Zorya Luhansk.

On 16 February 2018 Leonidas transferred to Olimpik Donetsk and signed two year deal with Ukrainian Premier League club. on 9 July 2018 he left Olimpik after the contract was terminated in mutual consent.

References

External links
Profile at Zerozero

1995 births
Living people
People from Pelotas
Brazilian footballers
Association football midfielders
Brazilian expatriate footballers
TSW Pegasus FC players
Metro Gallery FC players
Villa Nova Atlético Clube players
FC Zorya Luhansk players
FC Olimpik Donetsk players
Esporte Clube Passo Fundo players
S.C. Espinho players
Hong Kong Premier League players
Hong Kong First Division League players
Ukrainian Premier League players
Campeonato de Portugal (league) players
Expatriate footballers in Ukraine
Expatriate footballers in Hong Kong
Expatriate footballers in Portugal
Brazilian expatriate sportspeople in Hong Kong
Brazilian expatriate sportspeople in Ukraine
Brazilian expatriate sportspeople in Portugal
Sportspeople from Rio Grande do Sul